The 2019-20 Vermont Catamounts men's ice hockey season was the 57th season of play for the program, the 47th at the Division I level, and the 36th season in the Hockey East conference. The Catamounts represented the University of Vermont and were coached by Kevin Sneddon, in his 17th season.

In early February, Kevin Sneddon announced that he would retire at the end of the season.

Roster
As of September 7, 2019.

|}

Standings

Schedule and results

|-
!colspan=12 style=";" | Exhibition

|-
!colspan=12 style=";" | Regular Season

|-
!colspan=12 style=";" |

Scoring statistics

Goaltending statistics

Rankings

References

Vermont Catamounts men's ice hockey seasons
Vermont Catamounts
Vermont Catamounts
2019 in sports in Vermont
2020 in sports in Vermont